Rosie Goodwin is a set decorator. Goodwin was nominated for an Academy Award for Best Production Design for the 2013 film Gravity.

References

External links

Year of birth missing (living people)
Living people
Set decorators